The discography of Killing Joke, a British rock band, consists of 15 studio albums, seven live albums, 14 compilation albums, five extended plays (EPs), 31 singles and four video albums. The band formed in late 1978–early 1979 in Notting Hill, London, England.

In October 1979, shortly after they began the Malicious Damage record label, Killing Joke released their debut EP, Turn to Red.  It was shortly followed by their second EP, Almost Red, released in November, and by their first single, "Nervous System", released in December 1979.  Their first studio album, Killing Joke, was released in 1980. The album, which peaked at number 39 on the UK Albums Chart, produced three singles: "Wardance", "Change" and "Requiem". Their second studio album, What's THIS For...!, was released in 1981 and reached number 42 in the UK. "Follow the Leaders", the only single to be released from the album, charted in the UK and in the U.S. Their third album, Revelations, was released in 1982 and peaked at number 12 in the UK, and number 33 in New Zealand. Two singles, "Empire Song" and "Chop-Chop", were released from the album, but only "Empire Song" charted in the UK. After the release of their third EP, Birds of a Feather and the eponymous single, which charted in the UK, Killing Joke released their fourth studio album, Fire Dances, in July 1983. The only single from Fire Dances, "Let's All Go (to the Fire Dances)", and the album both charted in the UK. In October, they released "Me or You?", a non-album single that charted in the UK.

Their fifth album, Night Time, was released in 1985. It achieved mainstream success, reaching number 11 in the UK, 8 in the Netherlands, and 50 in Sweden, receiving the silver certification in the UK. It was preceded by the single "Eighties", non-album single "A New Day" and "Love Like Blood", and followed by "Kings and Queens". All four singles charted in the UK, but "Love Like Blood" was an international hit and charted in Germany, Ireland, Netherlands and New Zealand. The album itself peaked at number 11 in the UK, 8 in Netherlands, and 50 in Sweden. In 1986, Killing Joke released their sixth studio album, Brighter Than a Thousand Suns, and two singles, "Adorations" and "Sanity". The album charted in the UK and in the U.S., and both singles only in the UK. Outside the Gate, their seventh studio album, was released in 1988. While it was not promoted, the album and two singles from it, "America" and "My Love of This Land", charted in the UK. Coleman and Walker temporarily decided to disband the band. The Courtauld Talks, released in 1989, was essentially a spoken word album. Killing Joke's eighth album, Extremities, Dirt & Various Repressed Emotions, was released in 1990. It included two singles, "The Beautiful Dead" and "Money Is Not Our God". A Killing Joke anthology, Laugh? I Nearly Bought One!, and two singles featuring "Change" and "Wardance" in several new versions remixed by Youth, were released in 1992. Pandemonium, released 1994, and Democracy, in 1996, resulted in five singles: "Exorcism", "Millenium" (a UK Top 40 hit), "Pandemonium" (a UK Top 30 hit), "Jana" and "Democracy" (a UK Top 40 hit).

After the Democracy tour, the band went on an extended hiatus until 2002, when Coleman, Geordie and Youth reformed Killing Joke. Their second self-titled album was released in 2003. The album reached the UK Top 40, and produced two singles, "Loose Cannon" (a UK Top 25 hit) and "Seeing Red". In February 2005, Killing Joke played two consecutive shows to commemorate their 25th anniversary. DVD and CD recordings from these concerts were released in the fall of 2005 as XXV Gathering: The Band That Preys Together Stays Together. In June, remastered and expanded editions of their two 1990s Butterfly Recordings albums, Pandemonium and Democracy, were released by Cooking Vinyl. These were followed in July by their first four albums (from Killing Joke to Ha!) on EMI. Hosannas from the Basements of Hell was released in April 2006 on Cooking Vinyl. The album made the UK Top 75. Early in 2007, Killing Joke released three archival collections via Candlelight Records: Inside Extremities, Bootleg Vinyl Archive Volumes 1 & 2 and, in October, Extremities, Dirt & Various Repressed Emotions. On 28 January 2008, the albums Fire Dances, Night Time, Brighter Than a Thousand Suns and Outside the Gate were reissued in remastered form with bonus tracks by EMI. Each of these carried the message: Dedicated to our brother Paul Vincent Raven 1961–2007.

In 2008, Killing Joke released Duende - The Spanish Sessions and an album of radio session recordings, The Peel Sessions 1979-1981. The EP In Excelsis was released in 2010, and the following studio album, Absolute Dissent, was released in September 2010. On 2 April 2012, Killing Joke released their 15th studio album, MMXII on Spinefarm Records/Universal. It reached number 44 on the UK albums chart upon its first week of release, and number 9 on the Finnish albums chart.

On 23 October 2015, the band released their 16th studio album, Pylon.

Albums

Studio albums

Live albums

Compilation albums

Extended plays

Singles

Videography

Music videos

References

External links

 [ Killing Joke] at AllMusic
 Killing Joke at Discogs
 Killing Joke at Rate Your Music

Killing Joke
Discography
Killing Joke